Jalen Morton (born July 6, 1997) is an American football quarterback for the Birmingham Stallions of the United States Football League (USFL). He played college football at Prairie View A&M and went undrafted in the 2020 NFL Draft. He played for the Hamilton Tiger-Cats of the Canadian Football League (CFL) from 2021 to 2022.

Early years
Morton attended Seguin High School in Arlington, Texas. During his high school years, he passed for 1,041 yards and had 10 passing touchdowns.

Professional career

Green Bay Packers
On April 27, 2020, Morton signed with the Green Bay Packers. On August 3, 2020, Packers released Morton.

Indianapolis Colts
On February 1, 2021, Morton signed a reserve/future contract with the Indianapolis Colts. On August 6, 2021, Morton was waived by the Colts.

Hamilton Tiger-Cats 
Morton signed with the Hamilton Tiger-Cats of the Canadian Football League (CFL) on September 20, 2021. Following the 2021 season he re-signed on January 24, 2022. Morton got his first playing time at quarterback in Week 13 of the 2022 season after an injury to starting quarterback Dane Evans, and backup Jamie Newman proved ineffective in his debut. Morton completed only two of six pass attempts for 13 yards and an interception as the Tiger-Cats were defeated 28-8 by their rivals the Toronto Argonauts, falling to last place in the East division.

Birmingham Stallions
Morton signed with the Birmingham Stallions of the USFL on December 13, 2022.

References

External links
 CFL bio

Living people
1997 births
Green Bay Packers players
Hamilton Tiger-Cats players
Indianapolis Colts players
Prairie View A&M Panthers football players
Sportspeople from Arlington, Texas
Players of American football from Texas
Birmingham Stallions (2022) players